Velas is a village in Ratnagiri district of Maharashtra.  It is noted as a birthplace of Nana Phadnis. He was a sachiv - a secretary in Peshawai in Pune.  It is also famous for its beaches and turtle festival which is held by the local people of Velas and Sahyadri Nisarg Mitra, Chiploon.

References

Ratnagiri District Gazetteers, Places: Velas

Villages in Ratnagiri district